Corrigasleggaun at , is the 35th–highest peak in Ireland on the Arderin scale, and the 45th–highest peak on the Vandeleur-Lynam scale.  Corrigasleggaun is situated in the southwestern sector of the Wicklow Mountains range, and is part of the large massif of Lugnaquilla , Wicklow's highest mountain.   Corrigasleggaun lies at the head of the glen of the easterly flowing Carrawaystick River, which includes the scenic corrie lake of Kelly's Lough near its summit, and Carrawaystick Mountain at its base. Corrigasleggaun also lies alongside Lugnaquilla's South Prison, from which the River Ow flows south to the Aghavannagh Bridge.

Bibliography

Gallery

See also

Wicklow Way
Wicklow Round
Wicklow Mountains
Lists of mountains in Ireland
List of mountains of the British Isles by height
List of Hewitt mountains in England, Wales and Ireland

References

External links
MountainViews: The Irish Mountain Website, Corrigasleggaun 
MountainViews: Irish Online Mountain Database
The Database of British and Irish Hills , the largest database of British Isles mountains ("DoBIH")
Hill Bagging UK & Ireland, the searchable interface for the DoBIH

Mountains and hills of County Wicklow
Hewitts of Ireland
Mountains under 1000 metres